The Sunshine Underground is the third studio album by British indie band The Sunshine Underground, whose self-titled album marked a shift in genre from indie-rock in their previous two albums to a more electronic sound reminiscent of 80s synthpop.

Track listing

 Start – 5:53
 Finally We Arrive – 4:08
 Nothing To Fear – 3:53
 Don't Stop – 5:06
 Battles – 7:07
 Nightlife – 4:21
 The Same Old Ghosts – 6:25
 It Is Only You – 6:07
 Turn It On – 3:29
 Here Comes The Storm – 4:55

References

2014 albums
The Sunshine Underground albums